Soldier Camp is a populated place situated in Pima County, Arizona, United States. It is located along the Catalina Highway.

References

Populated places in Pima County, Arizona